The Grass Crown or Blockade Crown (corona obsidionalis) was the highest and rarest of all military decorations in the Roman Republic and early Roman Empire. It was presented only to a general, commander, or officer  whose actions saved a legion or the entire army.  One example of actions leading to awarding of a grass crown would be a general who broke the blockade around a beleaguered Roman army. The crown took the form of a chaplet made from plant materials taken from the battlefield, including grasses, flowers, and various cereals such as wheat; it was presented to the general by the army he had saved.

History
Pliny wrote about the grass crown at some length in his Natural History (Naturalis Historia): 

Pliny also lists the persons who by their deeds won the grass crown:
Lucius Siccius Dentatus 
Publius Decius Mus (received two grass crowns—one from his own army, and another from the surrounded troops he had rescued) 
Quintus Fabius Maximus Verrucosus (presented by "the Senate and people" after Hannibal had been expelled from Italy)
Marcus Calpurnius Flamma (during the First Punic War)
Scipio Aemilianus (in 148 BC in Africa)
Gnaeus Petreius Atinas (a primus pilus centurion during the Cimbrian War)
Lucius Cornelius Sulla (during the Social War at Nola, according to his own memoirs)
Quintus Sertorius (In 97 BC while serving in Hispania as a military tribune under Titus Didius)
Augustus (the crown was presented by the Roman Senate but was a political homage rather than a military award)
In La Respuesta (The Answer), Sor Juana Inés de la Cruz compares the obsidional crown to the crown of thorns placed upon Christ's head at his crucifixion as part of an extended metaphor about the suffering and persecution brought against all who display greater intelligence: But upon seeing so many and diverse crowns, I pondered which sort the crown given to Christ might be; and I think it must be the obsidional crown, which (as you know, my Lady) conferred the greatest honor and was called "obsidional" from obsidio, which means "siege." This crown was made neither of gold nor silver, but of the very grasses growing in the field where the brave deed was carried out. And Christ's feat was to raise the siege of the Prince of Darkness, who had encircled the entire earth, as Satan himself says in the Book of Job: "I have gone round about the earth, and walked through it"; and as St. Peter says of him, "Your adversary [the devil] goeth about seeking whom he may devour."' And our Chieftain came, and made Satan raise the siege: "Now shall the prince of this world be cast out." Thus, the soldiers crowned Him with neither gold nor silver, but with the plant springing up throughout the world, which was their field of battle. For after the curse, "Thorns and thistles shall it bring forth to thee," this world produced nothing but thorns.

See also
Camp crown
Mural crown
Civic crown
Naval crown
Laurel wreath
Chaplet (headgear)

References

External links
Corona

Military awards and decorations of ancient Rome
Crowns by culture